Ingelstad is a locality situated in Växjö Municipality, Kronoberg County, Sweden with 1,674 inhabitants in 2010. 

Ingelstad may also refer to Ingelstad Hundred, located in the province of Skåne.

References 

Populated places in Kronoberg County
Populated places in Växjö Municipality
Värend